Majidabad may refer to:

Majidabad, Nir, Ardabil Province
Majidabad, Parsabad, Ardabil Province
Majidabad, Ahar, East Azerbaijan Province
Majidabad, Malekan, East Azerbaijan Province
Majidabad, Hamadan
Majidabad, Khuzestan
Majidabad, Kamyaran, Kurdistan Province
Majidabad, Khondab, Markazi Province
Majidabad, Mazandaran
Majidabad, Qazvin
Majidabad, Qom
Majidabad, Sistan and Baluchestan
Majidabad, Zanjan

See also
Majdabad (disambiguation)